Beautiful Love (French: Bel amour) is a 1951 French drama film directed by François Campaux and starring Giselle Pascal, Antonio Vilar and Odile Versois.

The film's sets were designed by the art director Robert Hubert.

Main cast
 Giselle Pascal as Suzanne Gérard-Moulin 
 Antonio Vilar as Dr. Claude Moulin 
 Odile Versois as Helga Jorgensen 
 Catherine Fonteney as Mme Moulin 
 Marie-France as Petit-Pierre 
 Charlotte Ecard as Mme Girard 
 Adrienne D'Ambricourt as La vieille dame sourde 
 Madeleine Barbulée as L'assistante du docteur Moulin 
 Antoine Balpêtré as M. Moulin père 
 Michel Salina as Dr. Bettinger

References

Bibliography 
 Philippe Rège. Encyclopedia of French Film Directors, Volume 1. Scarecrow Press, 2009.

External links 
 

1951 films
1951 drama films
French drama films
1950s French-language films
Films directed by François Campaux
French black-and-white films
1950s French films